Resource was launched at Whitby in 1805. She was lost in 1810.

Career
Resource first appeared in the Register of Shipping (RS) in 1806.

Resource first appeared in Lloyd's Register (LR) in 1810.

Fate
Resource was lost on 16 March 1810 near Terceira Island as she was returning to London from Martinique. Her crew was saved.

Citations and references
Citations

References
 

1805 ships
Ships built in Whitby
Age of Sail merchant ships of England
Maritime incidents in 1810